This is intended to be a list of public domain tangos. Because many authors of tango music have died more than 70 years ago, the copyright has expired in many countries. Authorship works registered with SADAIC can be looked up at their web site.

According to Argentine law 11723, text and music can be considered as separate works.

See also
:Category:Tango musicians

References

External links
 SADAIC web site
 https://tango.info/work/genre.tango/publicdomain.ca

 
Tango